Ciprofibrate is a fibrate that was developed as a lipid-lowering agent.

It was patented in 1972 and approved for medical use in 1985.

References

2-Methyl-2-phenoxypropanoic acid derivatives
Organochlorides